Amifontaine station (French: Gare d'Amifontaine) is a French railway station located in the commune of Amifontaine, in the department of Aisne, northern France. The station is situated at kilometric point (KP) 27.949  on the Reims-Laon railway. It is served by TER Grand Est trains between Reims and Laon (line C10) operated by the SNCF.

In 2018, the SNCF recorded 15,470 passenger movements through the station.

History 
When the Compagnie des chemins de fer des Ardennes opened the 52 km Reims-Laon railway in 1857, the railway halt in Amifontaine had yet to be established. The station was still absent from the line in 1861. However, by 1868, the French writer Adolphe Joanne indicated the station was in operation in his book Itinéraire général de la France : Vosges et Ardennes. At the time the station served a population of 437 in Amifontaine only on Wednesdays, Saturdays and Sundays.

See also 

 List of SNCF stations in Hauts-de-France

References 

Railway stations in Aisne
Railway stations in France opened in the 1860s